Khalid Nabi Cemetery  ("Cemetery of the Prophet Khaled") is a cemetery in northeastern Iran's Golestan province near the border with Turkmenistan, roughly  northeast of Gonbad-e Kavous city, in the Gokcheh Dagh hills of Turkmen Sahra. It is mainly situated on a mountain ridge about 1 km distance from the mausoleum called “Khaled Nabi” who according to oral tradition of the Yomut Turkomans was a pre-Islamic prophet and whose mausoleum is visited by them for pilgrimage together with the neighbouring one of Ata Chofun ("Father Shepherd"), his son-in-law.

Description of the cemetery site
The cemetery was visited in 1979 and 1980 by the archeologist David Stronach. He found over 600 standing stones which are spread out in several locations. About half of them are on the ridge which he calls "High Plateau" South and south-east of that are small groups of stones on several other ridges and hillocks. At some distance there is another group of perhaps 150 stones which are distributed over a wide area on the south side of the mountain. ."

Stronach noted two types of gravestones on the site.  In both he saw "highly stylized representations of people."

Type 1 being of a cylindrical column type with a cap-like top with heights between 60 cm to 4 m. Many of them have horizontal ribs on the shaft.  Stronach interprets type 1 stones as depictions of men with their caps, helmets and in some case with clearly visible turbans, pointing to parallels in Turkic Ottoman gravemarkers.

Type 2 stones are generally smaller, have rectangular sections and two opposed high-set lobes. Stronach  interprets these as human shapes with arms in akimbo position as visible in two elaborately carved stones on the site which clearly show the human shape. He saw no indication for type 2 being female gravemarkers.

Stronach noted that the Khaled Nabi site is unique for stones of type 1, whereas he noted more recent stones of type 2 also in more distant locations along the so-called Alexander's Wall. He estimated the majority of stones dating from 17-19th centuries. He pointed to a possible identity of the present site with one described by James Baillie Fraser in early 19th century as belonging to the Turkoman Goklan tribe.

The cemetery in popular perception
In popular media the stones are often described as examples of phallic architecture and a major tourist attraction.

Touristic visitors often have perceived the cylindrical shafts with the thicker top as depictions of male phalli. This gave rise to popular guesses about pre-Islamic fertility cults as background to such perceived depictions. Consequently, the rounded type 2 stones were attributed to female forms and graves. Such descriptions have added to the popularity of the site for visitors from distant parts of Iran. The tomb is a religious pilgrimage place where women pray seeking boons for their welfare, by way of tying ribbons in nearby trees. The isolated cemetery has become popular tourist attraction in Iran and a source of amusement amongst visitors.

The cemetery is now a national heritage site protected by the Iranian government.

References

External links

Cemeteries in Iran
Buildings and structures in Golestan Province
Phallic monuments
Tourist attractions in Golestan Province